Herina gyrans is a species of ulidiid or picture-winged fly in the genus Herina of the family Ulidiidae found in Croatia, Spain, and Algeria.

References

Ulidiidae
Insects described in 1864
Diptera of Europe
Diptera of Africa
Taxa named by Hermann Loew